Liam Skelly (born 10 October 1941) is an Irish barrister, businessman and former politician from Dublin. He was a Teachta Dála (TD) for Dublin West from 1982 to 1987.

Dublin West by-election
Richard Burke, the Fine Gael TD for Dublin West, resigned his seat on 30 March 1982 to take up an appointment as Ireland's European Commissioner. Burke's appointment by the Taoiseach Charles Haughey was seen as a political "stroke". The appointment was in the gift of the Taoiseach, and all previous appointments had been from the governing party, but Haughey's government did not have a majority in Dáil Éireann, and could ill-afford to risk losing a seat in the by-election which would result from appointing a Fianna Fáil TD. Burke had been a Commissioner from 1977 to 1981, and had returned to the Dáil at the 1981 general election. The Dublin West seat was seen as winnable for Fianna Fáil, and Haughey's appointment of Burke raised the prospect of Fianna Fáil gaining a seat rather than losing one. In selecting a candidate, Fine Gael cast its net outside its own ranks, and chose Skelly, a businessman who had not previously been a member of a political party. After a closely fought campaign, Skelly won the Dublin West by-election on 25 May 1982. Eileen Lemass, contesting for Fianna Fáil, and who had been a TD for Dublin West until her defeat at the February 1982 general election, received more first-preference votes but Skelly won the seat on transfers.

In the Dáil
Skelly was re-elected at the November 1982 general election, but found himself increasingly out of step with the direction taken by the government, and clashed with the leadership and with the constituency organisation. At the 1987 general election, he sought the Fine Gael nomination but was not selected. He contested the election as an independent for the rest of the 24th Dáil, but won only 3.4% of the first-preference votes and lost his seat.

References

1941 births
Living people
Businesspeople from County Dublin
Fine Gael TDs
Independent TDs
Irish barristers
Members of the 23rd Dáil
Members of the 24th Dáil
Politicians from County Dublin